Lignyodes varius is a species of leguminous seed weevil in the beetle family Curculionidae.

References

Further reading

 
 

Curculioninae
Articles created by Qbugbot
Beetles described in 1876